Annobonese Creole is a Portuguese creole known to its speakers as  or  . It  is spoken on the Annobón and Bioko Islands off the coast of Equatorial Guinea, mostly by people of mixed African, Portuguese and Spanish descent.

The attitude in the country towards this language is positive. It is taught in special courses in the capital of Equatorial Guinea, Malabo.

Origins

The creole language was spoken originally by the descendants of intermixing between Portuguese men and African women slaves imported from other places, especially from São Tomé and Angola, and therefore descends from Portuguese and Forro, the creole of the freed slaves of São Tomé. The government of Equatorial Guinea financed an Instituto Internacional da Língua Portuguesa (IILP) sociolinguistic study in Annobón, which noticed strong links with the Portuguese creole populations in São Tomé and Príncipe, Cape Verde and Guinea-Bissau.

Features

Annobonese is analogous to Forro.  In fact, it may be derived from Forro as it shares the same structure and 82% of its lexicon. After Annobón passed to Spain, the language incorporated some words of Spanish origin (10% of its lexicon),, but it is often difficult to say from which language the word derive, given the similarity between Spanish and Portuguese. Today, the Spanish language is the official language of the island, although it is not much spoken and the Portuguese creole has vigorous use in the island and in the capital Malabo and with some speakers in Equatorial Guinea's mainland. Noncreolized Portuguese is used as liturgical language. Portuguese has been declared an official language in Equatorial Guinea, but so far is rarely used in Bioko and Río Muni.

Grammar



Simple Sentences 
Fa d’Ambô follows a subject-verb-object (SVO) word order. Sentences that are ditransitive (they include a direct object pronoun as well as an indirect object pronoun) must place the indirect object in precedence to the direct object- this arrangement is equivalent to that of the Spanish arrangement, a language which Fa d’Ambô is based heavily on. However, unlike Spanish, an indirect object is not preceded/marked by a preposition in Fa d’Ambô. The table below displays one sentence translated across Fa d’Ambô, Spanish, and English to further highlight this specific matter:

The literal English translation of Pay da mina dyielu would be "Father give child money." In Spanish, the preposition a "to" precedes the indirect object el niño "the child" (a + el contract into al), forming the overall meaning "... to the child." Fa d’Ambô lacks the use of this type of prepositional marker before indirect objects.

Noun Classification 
Nouns of Annobonese Creole are generally invariable, without employing grammatical gender or class. However, to express the specific gender of an animate noun to differentiate something that is male versus female, napay (male, man) or miela (female) may be added to the root word. For example: napay may be joined with mina (child) to form napay mina (boy, son). The same may be done with miela + mina = miela mina (girl, daughter).

Plurality 
The plurality of a noun in Annobonese Creole usually goes unmarked (Ø) due to the fact that it can be implied from the context in which the noun fits within a sentence or clause. If the plurality cannot be directly implied and a type of plurality marker is necessary, there are a few ways in which to do so:

 Employ a plural demonstrative (i.e. these, those). Example: galafa (bottle) + -nensyi (those) = galafa nensyi (those bottles)
 Employ a numeral adjective. Example: canoe (canoe) + tisyi (three) = canoe tisyi (three canoes)
 Employ a quantitative adjective. Example: xadyi (house) + muntu (much) = xadyi muntu (many houses)
 Reduplicate the noun (full reduplication). Note that this specific plurality marker indicates the inclusion of all members of a noun. Example: ngolo (shell) + ngolo = ngolo ngolo (all the shells)

Articles 
Articles are only used in the language when speakers feel they are necessary. When they are included, they are positioned directly before the noun. The definite article utilizes one form for both the singular and plural forms of nouns, na. The indefinite article can appear as either wan or an for nouns in the singular form and zuguan for the plural counterparts. Example: The Annobonese sentence Na may banku translates to English as "The white woman", where na is the definite article "the", may signifies "woman", and banku serves as the color adjective "white." The indefinite article is used in the example in the section above regarding word order, where wan serves to mark an undefined xat (letter): No skéve wan xat (We write a letter).

Combinations of articles with plurality markers (refer to plurality section above) are also common in the language. These combinations can aid to clarify the plurality of definite articles, seeing as they have no plural form on their own. Example: Na mina nensyi (These/those children). Nensyi serves as the plural demonstrative "these" or "those." Na mina, without the implementation of the plural demonstrative, could be interpreted as singular "the child" rather than plural "the children", assuming context is unknown.

References

Bibliography

External links
APiCS Online - Survey chapter: Fa d’Ambô

Annobón
Portuguese-based pidgins and creoles
Languages of Equatorial Guinea
Portuguese language in Africa